Newmerella is a small township five kilometres west of Orbost, in Victoria, Australia. The Newmerella town and area has a population of 336. The township has one service station and a school (Newmerella Primary School) and is serviced by a school bus from Newmerella to Orbost for students attending Orbost Secondary College.

References

Towns in Victoria (Australia)
Shire of East Gippsland